A DNA repair-deficiency disorder is a medical condition due to reduced functionality of DNA repair.

DNA repair defects can cause an accelerated aging disease or an increased risk of cancer, or sometimes both.

DNA repair defects and accelerated aging

DNA repair defects are seen in nearly all of the diseases described as  accelerated aging disease, in which various tissues, organs or systems of the human body age prematurely. Because the accelerated aging diseases display different aspects of aging, but never every aspect, they are often called segmental progerias by biogerontologists.

Human disorders with accelerated aging
Ataxia-telangiectasia
Bloom syndrome
Cockayne syndrome
Fanconi anemia
Progeria (Hutchinson–Gilford progeria syndrome)
Rothmund–Thomson syndrome
Trichothiodystrophy
Werner syndrome
Xeroderma pigmentosum

Examples
Some examples of DNA repair defects causing progeroid syndromes in humans or mice are shown in Table 1.

DNA repair defects distinguished from "accelerated aging"
Most of the DNA repair deficiency diseases show varying degrees of "accelerated aging" or cancer (often some of both). But elimination of any gene essential for  base excision repair kills the embryo—it is too lethal to display symptoms (much less symptoms of cancer or "accelerated aging"). 
Rothmund-Thomson syndrome and xeroderma pigmentosum display symptoms dominated by vulnerability to cancer, whereas progeria and Werner syndrome show the most features of "accelerated aging". Hereditary nonpolyposis colorectal cancer (HNPCC) is very often caused by a defective MSH2 gene leading to defective mismatch repair, but displays no symptoms of "accelerated aging". On the other hand, Cockayne Syndrome and trichothiodystrophy show mainly features of accelerated aging, but apparently without an increased risk of cancer Some DNA repair defects manifest as neurodegeneration rather than as cancer or "accelerated aging".  (Also see the "DNA damage theory of aging" for a discussion of the evidence that DNA damage is the primary underlying cause of aging.)

Debate concerning "accelerated aging"
Some biogerontologists question that such a thing as "accelerated aging" actually exists, at least partly on the grounds that all of the so-called accelerated aging diseases are segmental progerias. Many disease conditions such as diabetes, high blood pressure, etc., are associated with increased mortality. Without reliable biomarkers of aging it is hard to support the claim that a disease condition represents more than accelerated mortality.

Against this position other biogerontologists argue that premature aging phenotypes are identifiable symptoms associated with mechanisms of molecular damage. The fact that these phenotypes are widely recognized justifies classification of the relevant diseases as "accelerated aging". Such conditions, it is argued, are readily distinguishable from genetic diseases associated with increased mortality, but not associated with an aging phenotype, such as cystic fibrosis and sickle cell anemia. It is further argued that segmental aging phenotype is a natural part of aging insofar as genetic variation leads to some people being more disposed than others to aging-associated diseases such as cancer and Alzheimer's disease.

DNA repair defects and increased cancer risk
Individuals with an inherited impairment in DNA repair capability are often at increased risk of cancer.  When a mutation is present in a DNA repair gene, the repair gene will either not be expressed or be expressed in an altered form.  Then the repair function will likely be deficient, and, as a consequence, damages will tend to accumulate.  Such DNA damages can cause errors during DNA synthesis leading to mutations, some of which may give rise to cancer.  Germ-line DNA repair mutations that increase the risk of cancer are listed in the Table.

See also
 Biogerontology
 Degenerative disease
 DNA damage theory of aging
 Genetic disorder
 Senescence

References

External links 

 BRCA - Companion Reviews and Search Terms
BRCA1  - Companion Reviews and Search Terms
BRCA2  - Companion Reviews and Search Terms
ATM  - Companion Reviews and Search Terms
NBS1  - Companion Reviews and Search Terms
Bloom s syndrome  - Companion Reviews and Search Terms
 Fanconi s anemia - Companion Reviews and Search Terms
WRN - Companion Reviews and Search Terms
 RECQ- Companion Reviews and Search Terms
RECQL4 - Companion Reviews and Search Terms
FANCJ - Companion Reviews and Search Terms
FANCM - Companion Reviews and Search Terms
FANCN  - Companion Reviews and Search Terms
XPB  - Companion Reviews and Search Terms
XPD  - Companion Reviews and Search Terms
XPG  - Companion Reviews and Search Terms
MSH6  - Companion Reviews and Search Terms
MUTYH  - Companion Reviews and Search Terms
DNA repair and toxicology  - Companion Reviews and Search Terms
Neoplasia inherited - Companion Reviews and Search Terms
 Neoplasia carcinogenesis - Companion Reviews and Search Terms
Segmental Progeria

Cancer
DNA repair
Mutation
DNA replication and repair-deficiency disorders
Causes of conditions
Senescence